The 1891 Hong Kong Sanitary Board election held on 17 June 1891 was the second election for the two unofficial seats in the Sanitary Board of Hong Kong.

Only ratepayers on the jury lists of the year were eligible to vote.

There were 256 out of the 445 persons of the electorate voted. Each elector could cast up to two votes.

Overview of outcome

References
 Endacott, G. B. Government and people in Hong Kong, 1841-1962 : a constitutional history Hong Kong University Press. (1964)
 "The Sanitary Board Election". The China Mail. 18 June 1891. p. 3.

1891 elections in Asia
1891 in Hong Kong
Sanitary
June 1891 events